Corosalia tigrina is a harvestman (a member of the order Opiliones) belonging to the family Cosmetidae.

References

Cosmetidae
Animals described in 1998